Ida of Lorraine (also referred to as Blessed Ida of Boulogne) was a saint and noblewoman.

She was the daughter of Godfrey III, Duke of Lower Lorraine and his wife Doda. Ida's grandfather was Gothelo I, Duke of Lorraine and Ida's brother was Godfrey IV, Duke of Lower Lorraine.

Family
In 1049, she married Eustace II, Count of Boulogne. They had three sons:

Eustace III, the next Count of Boulogne
Godfrey of Bouillon, first ruler of Kingdom of Jerusalem
Baldwin, second ruler of Kingdom of Jerusalem
A daughter, Ida of Boulogne, has also been postulated.  She was married first to Herman von Malsen and second to Conon, Count of Montaigu.

Ida shunned the use of a wet-nurse in raising her children. Instead, she breast-fed them to ensure that they were not contaminated by the wet-nurse's morals, i.e. her mode of living. When her sons went on the First Crusade, Ida contributed heavily to their expenses.

Life
Ida was always religiously and charitably active, but the death of her husband provided her wealth and the freedom to use it for her projects.  She founded several monasteries:

Saint-Wulmer in Boulogne-sur-Mer
Our Lady of the Chapel, Calais
Saint-Bertin
Abbey of Cappelle
Abbey of Le Wast

She maintained a correspondence with Anselm of Canterbury. Some of Anselm's letters to Ida have survived.

She became increasingly involved in church life. However, current scholarship feels that she did not actually become a Benedictine Nun, but that she was a "Secular Oblate of the Benedictine Order".

Death and burial
Ida died on 13 April 1113, which is the date she is honoured. Traditionally, her burial place has been ascribed to the monastery of Le Wast. Her remains were moved in 1669 to Paris and again in 1808 to Bayeux.

Her life story was written by a contemporary monk of the monastery of Le Wast.

She is venerated in Bayeux.

References

Sources

1040s births
1113 deaths
11th-century French people
11th-century French women
12th-century French people
12th-century French women
Medieval French saints
Christian female saints of the Middle Ages
11th-century Christian saints
Countesses of Boulogne
House of Ardenne–Verdun